ISTD may refer to:
 Imperial Society of Teachers of Dancing
 In situ thermal desorption (see also Thermal blanket)
 Institute for the Scientific Treatment of Delinquency, now called Centre for Crime and Justice Studies
 International Society of Typographic Designers